Cambridge-Narrows Community School is a K-12 school located in Queens County, New Brunswick, on the south bank of the Washademoak Lake in the village of Cambridge-Narrows. Cambridge-Narrows Community School is in the Anglophone West School District.

The school also services the outlying communities of Codys, Jemseg, Whites Cove, Mill Cove and Waterborough. Cambridge-Narrows Community School is the only rural New Brunswick school to house an early learning centre for children 3 and 4 years old.

Cambridge-Narrows Community School is also home to Cambridge-Narrow Huskies Basketball Team, they have teams for middle level, and high school. The school also provides a health committee, formed by students and a health professional. The committee is open to grades 5–12; they meet up four times a year and discuss general health topics like, healthy eating, physical activities, MADD, etc. Sign up sheets for the health committee for usually placed in classrooms. The school also provides opportunities for the elementary students by providing an Arts and Lego Club. Sign up sheets are sent home with elementary students, the groups meet up once a month in the art room. Students are not required to go to all sessions. But asked to sign up in the beginning of September and January, to make sure that there is enough supplies for everyone. Middle Level and high school students to sign up to help out as volunteers, during these clubs.

See also
 List of schools in New Brunswick
 Anglophone West School District

References

Schools in Queens County, New Brunswick
High schools in New Brunswick
Elementary schools in New Brunswick
Middle schools in New Brunswick